The Van Gelder House was a historic house at 347 Godwin Avenue in Wyckoff, New Jersey. The house was built in 1730 and was added to the National Register of Historic Places on January 10, 1983.  It has apparently been demolished.

See also
National Register of Historic Places listings in Bergen County, New Jersey

References

Houses on the National Register of Historic Places in New Jersey
Houses completed in 1730
Houses in Bergen County, New Jersey
National Register of Historic Places in Bergen County, New Jersey
Wyckoff, New Jersey
New Jersey Register of Historic Places